Arte Povera (literally "poor art") was an art movement that took place between the end of the 1960s and the beginning of the 1970s in major cities throughout Italy and above all in Turin. Other cities where the movement was also important are Milan, Rome, Genoa, Venice, Naples and Bologna. The term was coined by Italian art critic Germano Celant in 1967 and introduced in Italy during the period of upheaval at the end of the 1960s, when artists were taking a radical stance. Artists began attacking the values of established institutions of government, industry, and culture.

Some of the first exhibitions of artists associated with Arte Povera were held at the Christian Stein Gallery in Turin, run by Margherita Stein. The exhibition "Im Spazio" (The Space of Thoughts), curated by Celant and held at the Galleria La Bertesca in Genoa, Italy, from September through October 1967, is often considered to be the official starting point of Arte Povera. Celant, who became one of Arte Povera's major proponents, organized two exhibitions in 1967 and 1968, followed by an influential book published by Electa in 1985 called Arte Povera Storie e protagonisti/Arte Povera. Histories and Protagonists, promoting the notion of a revolutionary art, free of convention, the power of structure, and the market place.

Although Celant attempted to encompass the radical elements of the entire international scene, the term properly centered on a group of Italian artists who attacked the corporate mentality with an art of unconventional materials and style. Key figures closely associated with the movement are Giovanni Anselmo, Alighiero Boetti, Enrico Castellani, Pier Paolo Calzolari, Luciano Fabro, Jannis Kounellis, Mario Merz, Marisa Merz, Giulio Paolini, Pino Pascali, Giuseppe Penone,  Michelangelo Pistoletto, Emilio Prini, and Gilberto Zorio.  They often used found objects in their works. Other early exponents of radical change in the visual arts include proto Arte Povera artists: Antoni Tàpies and the Dau al Set movement, Alberto Burri, Piero Manzoni, and Lucio Fontana and Spatialism. Art dealer Ileana Sonnabend was a champion of the movement.

Trends and concepts

 A return to simple objects and messages
 The body and behavior are art
 The everyday becomes meaningful
 Traces of nature and industry appear
 Dynamism and energy are embodied in the work
 Nature can be documented in its physical and chemical transformation
 Explore the notion of space and language
 Complex and symbolic signs lose meaning
 Ground Zero, no culture, no art system, Art = Life

Artists
Michelangelo Pistoletto began painting on mirrors in 1962, connecting painting with the constantly changing realities in which the work finds itself. In the later 1960s he began bringing together rags with casts of omnipresent classical statuary of Italy to break down the hierarchies of "art" and common things. An art of impoverished materials is certainly one aspect of the definition of Arte Povera. In his 1967  (Rag Wall), Pistoletto makes an exotic and opulent tapestry wrapping common bricks in discarded scraps of fabric.

Jannis Kounellis and Mario Merz attempted to make the experience of art more immediately real while also more closely connecting the individual to nature. In his (Untitled /Twelve Horses), Kounellis brings the real, natural life into the gallery setting, by showing twelve horses racked-up on the gallery walls. Recalling the Dada movement and Marcel Duchamp, his aim was to challenge what could be defined as art, but unlike Duchamp, maintains the objects real and alive, redefining the notion of life and art, while keeping both entities independent. Piero Gilardi, much like the aim of Arte Povera itself, was concerned with bridging the natural and the artificial. In his (Nature Carpets), 1965, which gained him recognition and assimilation into the Arte Povera movement, Gilardi built three-dimensional carpets out of polyurethane which used "natural" leaves, rocks, and soil as decoration, design and art meshed together to question societal sensibilities towards what is real and natural and how artificiality was being engrained into the contemporary commercialized world.

List of artists

Giovanni Anselmo
Alighiero Boetti
Alberto Burri
Pier Paolo Calzolari
Enrico Castellani
Claudio Cintoli
Luciano Fabro
Piero Gilardi
Jannis Kounellis
Piero Manzoni
Mario Merz
Marisa Merz
Giulio Paolini
Pino Pascali
Giuseppe Penone
Gianni Piacentino
Michelangelo Pistoletto
Emilio Prini
Guillem Ramos-Poquí
Gilberto Zorio

See also
 Jerzy Grotowski
 Nnenna Okore

References

References
 Celant, Germano, Arte Povera: Histories and Protagonists, Milan: Electa, 1985.  (Republished as Arte Povera: History and Stories, 2011. )
 Celant, Germano, Tommaso Trini, Jean-Christophe Ammann, Harald Szeemann and Ida Gianelli. Arte povera, Milan: Charta, 2001. 
 Christov-Bakargiev, Carolyn (Ed.). Arte Povera. London: Phaidon, 1999. 
 Flood, Richard, and Morris, Frances. Zero to infinity: Arte povera 1962-1972. London: Tate Publishing, 2001. 
 Lista, Giovanni, L’Arte Povera, Cinq Continents Éditions, Milan-Paris, 2006. 
 Lumley, Robert. Arte Povera. London: Tate Pub.; New York: Distributed in North America by Harry N. Abrams, 2004. , 
 Jacopo Galimberti, "A Third-worldist Art? Germano Celant's Invention of Arte Povera", volume 36, issue 2, Art History, 2013, 418-441.  .
 Manacorda, Francesco, and Robert Lumley, Marcello Levi: Portrait of a Collector, Turin: Hopefulmonster, 2005 Estorick Collection. London. .

External links
 "Arte Povera". Glossary of Art, Architecture & Design since 1945, 3rd. ed.
 Germano Celant, Arte povera, history and stories, Electa
 Arte Povera at Artcyclopedia
 Walker Art Museum exhibit, 2001-2002
 Tate Collection glossary
 Studio International magazine review of Arte Povera exhibit
 GOLDFISH BOWL KNIFE - Jannis Kounellis at MONA Hobart Tasmania

 
Contemporary art movements
Italian art movements
Italian contemporary art
1960s in art
1970s in art
1960s in Italy
1970s in Italy
Modern art
Art movements